Expressway S7 or express road S7 is a major road in Poland which has been planned to run from Gdańsk on the Baltic coast through Elbląg, Warsaw, Radom, Kielce and Kraków to Rabka near the border with Slovakia. On almost the entire route, the S7 will be built by upgrading the existing National Road 7 (DK 7).

The upgrade is part of a European plan to fund 330 kilometers of new express roads in Poland.

According to current government plans, the road is to be completed by 2026, with the exception of Kraków - Myślenice section (25 km) where the existing dual carriageway national road 7 will serve the traffic until S7 is constructed in unspecified future. In 2020, a study for a dual-carriageway extension of S7 from Rabka-Zdrój to the Polish-Slovak border (connecting to R3 expressway) was announced. Tunnel Zakopianka after many delays is due to open in the beginning of 2023.

See also 
 European route E77

References 

Expressways in Poland
Proposed roads in Poland